U2 small nuclear ribonucleoprotein A' is a protein that in humans is encoded by the SNRPA1 gene.

Interactions 

SNRPA1 has been shown to interact with CDC5L.

References

Further reading